Burr's Ferry Bridge is a bridge on the Sabine River, where Louisiana State Highway 8 meets Texas State Highway 63 at the Louisiana/Texas state border between Burkeville, Texas, and Burr Ferry, Louisiana.

The bridge includes three Parker through truss spans and 34 concrete girder spans.

Gallery

See also
National Register of Historic Places listings in Calcasieu Parish, Louisiana
National Register of Historic Places listings in Newton County, Texas

References

External links

Sabine River History: Newton County, Texas

Road bridges on the National Register of Historic Places in Louisiana
Buildings and structures in Newton County, Texas
Buildings and structures in Vernon Parish, Louisiana
1925 establishments in Louisiana
National Register of Historic Places in Vernon Parish, Louisiana
National Register of Historic Places in Newton County, Texas
Road bridges on the National Register of Historic Places in Texas
Girder bridges in the United States
Parker truss bridges in the United States